The first season of the action-adventure television series The A-Team premiered in the United States on NBC on January 23, 1983, and concluded on May 10, 1983, consisting of 14 episodes.

Cast
 George Peppard as Lieutenant Colonel/Colonel John "Hannibal" Smith
 Tim Dunigan as First Lieutenant Templeton Arthur "Faceman" Peck (two-hour pilot only)
 Dirk Benedict as First Lieutenant Templeton Arthur "Faceman" Peck (other 12 episodes)
 Melinda Culea as Journalist/Reporter Amy Amanda "Triple A" Allen
 Dwight Schultz as Captain H. M. Murdock
 Mr. T as Sergeant First Class Bosco Albert "B. A." (Bad Attitude) Baracus

Episodes

The A-Team seasons
1983 American television seasons